{{Speciesbox
|image = Olearia rudis.jpg
|image_caption = 
|genus = Olearia
|species = rudis
|authority = (Benth.) F.Muell. ex Benth.
|synonyms_ref = 
|synonyms = {{collapsible list|
 Aster exul Lindl. 
 Eurybia rudis Benth. 
 Eurybia rudis var. arguta Benth. 
 Eurybia rudis Benth. var. rudis 
 Eurybia scabra Benth. 
 Olearia rudis F.Muell. nom. inval., pro syn.
 Olearia rudis var. glabriuscula Benth. 
 Olearia rudis (Benth.) F.Muell. ex Benth. var. rudis 
 Olearia rudis var. scabra (Benth.) Benth. 
 Shawia rudis (Benth.) Sch.Bip. 
 Shawia scabra (Benth.) Sch.Bip.
}}
}}Olearia rudis, commonly known as azure daisy-bush, is a species of flowering plant in the family Asteraceae and is endemic to eastern Australia. It is a usually short-lived shrub with crowded elliptic or egg-shaped leaves, and pale blue, mauve or purple and orange, daisy-like inflorescences.

Both surface of the leaves are bristly-hairy, the edges are often serrated, and the base is slightly stem-clasping.

Taxonomy
This daisy was first formally described in 1837 by George Bentham who gave it the name Eurybia rudis in Enumeratio plantarum quas in Novae Hollandiae ora austro-occidentali ad fluvium Cygnorum et in sinu Regis Georgii collegit Carolus Liber Baro de Hügel from specimens collected near the Swan River. In 1867, Bentham changed the name to Olearia rudis in Flora Australiensis. The specific epithet (rudis) means "rough" or "wild".

Distribution and habitatOlearia rudis'' grows in mallee and woodland in western New South Wales, north-western Victoria and the south-east of South Australia.

References

rudis
Asterales of Australia
Flora of New South Wales
Flora of Victoria (Australia)
Flora of South Australia
Plants described in 1837
Taxa named by George Bentham